Bastarz (Korean: 바스타즈 (Baseutajeu); stylized BASTARZ) is the first official sub-unit of the South Korean boy band Block B. Established in April 2015, the sub-unit consists of three members: Block B's two main dancers, B-Bomb and U-Kwon, and the rapper P.O. The sub-unit debuted with their first mini album, entitled Conduct Zero, on April 14, 2015, released their second mini album, Welcome 2 Bastarz, on October 31, 2016, and released their third, I'm a Mess, on March 28, 2019.

Origin
Although the members of Bastarz initially said they were chosen out of Block B's seven members through a random draw of colored balls, they later said that this was a joke, and that Seven Seasons' CEO chose them for the sub-unit.

History
On April 5 and 6, 2015, Block B announced through solo teaser photos that P.O, U-Kwon, and B-Bomb would make up Bastarz. Though not a part of the sub-unit, Zico confirmed that he produced Bastarz' first title track.

The sub-unit's album was released April 13, 2015, along with a video for the title track, "Zero for Conduct." The album debuted at #3 on the Gaon album chart, with the singles "Conduct Zero," "Charlie Chaplin," "Thief," "Nobody but You," and "Sue Me" debuting on the Gaon digital chart at #6, #24, #63, #65, and #76, respectively.

Bastarz' "Conduct Zero" was nominated for five awards in 2015, including two MAMAs, two Seoul Music Awards, and a Melon Music Award for best dance performance.

In October 2015, Bastarz made their Japanese debut with the release of the CD single Hinko Zero, which reached #20 on the Oricon chart.

The following year saw Bastarz' second Korean release. The sub-unit's lead single "Selfish & Beautiful Girl," composed by P.O, was released on October 24, 2016. A follow up single, titled "Make It Rain," composed by Dean, was released on October 31 along with the full Welcome 2 Bastarz extended play, which debuted at #6 on the Gaon album chart. The following week, the sub-unit made a surprise video release for the song "That's Right," featuring the members filming each other as they travel.

P.O received lyrics credits for all five songs on Welcome 2 Bastarz and composition credits for "Selfish & Beautiful Girl," "That's Right," and "The Hidden Girl," while B-Bomb received both lyrics and composition credits for the song "Tightly."

On April 29, 2017, Bastarz performed at the Korea Times Music Festival, held at the Hollywood Bowl.

On May 20, 2018, Bastarz competed on the JTBC music show Two Yoo Project Sugar Man. Bastarz won the show with a remake of "An Alley," a song by Yang Dong-geun that itself was a remake of a song by Lee Jae-min.

Two Bastarz concerts were announced February 23, 2019, to take place March 29 and March 30 in Seoul.

Bastarz released their third mini-album, I'm a Mess, on March 28, 2019. The album contains eight songs, including three solo songs, and the group members were heavily involved in the production of the album: P.O received lyrics credit for five songs on the album and composition credit for three, B-Bomb received lyrics credit for two songs and composition credits for three, and U-Kwon received lyrics and composition credit for one song.

Discography

Extended plays

Single albums

Promotional singles

Other charted songs

Videography

Music videos

Awards

References

External links
 Seven Seasons
 Block B Japanese Website

2015 establishments in South Korea
K-pop music groups
Musical groups established in 2015
South Korean musical trios
South Korean dance music groups
South Korean hip hop groups
South Korean boy bands
Block B